Night of Decadence, commonly referred to as NOD, is a party held every year around Halloween at Wiess College at Rice University.

The party was first held in 1972 and quickly became a legendary event at Rice and in Houston, drawing young alumni and students from other universities in addition to Rice students. It was also named to the Top 10 College Parties in America by Playboy magazine.

Overview 

At NOD, students may wear whatever makes them comfortable. A typical costume is boxer shorts for men, and bra and panties for women. Starting in the 2010s, NOD has featured a Halloween costume contest, offering prizes to students who come wearing the most creative attire. Because of its sex positivity, NOD historically has been a polarizing event on Rice campus. Other events on campus such as Evening of Elegance (recently started in 2014), and Night of Innocence (offered since at least the 1980s) provide students with diverse social options, many choosing to attend more than one event. NOD has long been one of the most popular parties on campus, though the decorations have become more conservative in recent years. Each year over one thousand people are expected to attend NOD. 

Significant safety efforts were instituted starting in 1999. As of 2018, Wiess spends around $7,000 on security and ambulances in order to provide a safe experience to NOD attendees.

The party now garners over 1,500 people.

Beginnings
NOD was founded by 4 Wiess College men.  In the early '70s, each college at Rice had an event to raise money to fund the college's parties for the year.  At that time, the drinking age was 18 and the colleges sponsored on-campus parties with alcohol.  Wiess had the least amount of funds.  The Wiess men were tasked with coming up with a fundraiser party.

Year 1: "Night of Decadence" - The general idea was to buy as much booze as they could, pour it into trashcans, and drink.  The concoction was primarily Everclear, cheap wine, and fruit. The first year no one from any other college attended.  There were about 30 Wiess men who attended.  Even so, the college did manage to break even.

Year 2: "Night of Decadence II" - The same no-theme theme continued.  But, a few non-Wiess students attended, even a few women.  The college made a little money the second year.

Year 3: "Return of Night of Decadence" - The word was finally getting out.  By the third year, a much larger crowd attended and a large profit was made.

Year 4: "Beyond Night of Decadence" - This was the first year that NOD was truly a toga party.  Everyone on campus showed up and it was the major party of the year.

Early history

The Houston Press suggested the college began adopting a theme for each year's party in 1976. However, it is wrong.  According to the founders, togas and minimal clothing was there at the beginning.  It has been suggested that in the 1970s and 1980s, many of the themes were historical and/or apocalyptic in nature (e.g. The Fall of Rome, Caligula, Armageddon, Animal Farm, the Trojan War).  Again, according to the founders, that is incorrect, at least for the first years.  The founders were not going for historical or apocalyptic: The founders made a conscious decision to name the year's NOD with a nod to a movie title.  By the 1990s the themes were generally sexual puns, often based on movie titles (e.g., James Bondage, Lust in Space). In the past, the university administration tried to shut down the party because of concerns about alcohol use and harassment due to NOD's sexual nature.

For many years NOD's trademark was "Sparky", a giant phallus built of papier-mâché and suspended from the ceiling of the Commons. (Sparky's also became the nickname of Wiess's basement game room.) Often Sparky was aligned with a corresponding anatomical prop at the other end of the room; one year a motor was added to move Sparky back and forth during the party. In some years a second Sparky was constructed with internal tubing that delivered Everclear punch from an upstairs mixing area to a suitably shaped serving trough below.

NOD themes

References

Which college comes out tops in Fun 101? DallasNews published Sept 21, 1991
College collage Alumni share insights with Sam Houston students Fort Worth Star-Telegram published January 10, 1994

Parties
Rice University